The People's Assembly of Bosnia and Herzegovina was an assembly formed on 26 April 1945 in Bosnia and Herzegovina.

Presidents of the People's Assembly (1953–1990)

References

External links
parlament.ba

Political history of Bosnia and Herzegovina